In the 1881 Iowa State Senate elections Iowa voters elected state senators to serve in the nineteenth Iowa General Assembly. Elections were held in 25 of the state senate's 50 districts. State senators serve four-year terms in the Iowa State Senate.

The general election took place on October 11, 1881.

Following the previous election, Republicans had control of the Iowa Senate with 41 seats to Democrats' seven seats and two Greenbackers.

To claim control of the chamber from Republicans, the Democrats needed to net 19 Senate seats.

Republicans maintained control of the Iowa State Senate following the 1881 general election with the balance of power shifting to Republicans holding 45 seats, Democrats having two seats, two Greenbackers, and one Independent (a net gain of 4 seats for Republicans and 1 Independent seat).

Summary of Results
Note: The holdover Senators not up for re-election are not listed on this table.

Source:

Detailed Results
NOTE: The Iowa Official Register does not contain detailed vote totals for state senate elections in 1881.

See also
 Elections in Iowa

References

External links
Iowa State Senate Districts 1878-83 map

Iowa Senate
Iowa
Iowa Senate elections